Ibbenbüren is a railway station located in Ibbenbüren, Germany. The station was opened on 28 June 1856 is located on the Löhne–Rheine line. The train services are operated by WestfalenBahn.

Train services
The station is served by the following services:

Regional services  Rheine - Osnabrück - Minden - Hanover - Braunschweig
Local services  Bad Bentheim - Rheine - Osnabrück - Herford - Bielefeld

Bus services

There is a bus station outside the station.

References

Railway stations in North Rhine-Westphalia
Railway stations in Germany opened in 1856
Ibbenbüren